Martyn Day may refer to:

 Martyn Day (lawyer), British lawyer
 Martyn Day (politician) (born 1971), Scottish politician